Citadel of the Hồ Dynasty (Hán Nôm: 城家胡; also called Tây Đô castle or Tây Giai castle) is a 15th century stone fortress in Thanh Hóa, Vietnam. It served as the western capital of the Hồ dynasty (1398–1407) while also being an important political, economic and cultural centre in the 16th to the 18th century. It is located in Tây Giai commune, Vĩnh Lộc District, in Thanh Hóa Province, in Vietnam's North Central Coast region.

Tây Đô castle is rectangular in shape. There are four gates: one at the south (fore gate), one at the north (back gate), one at the east (left gate), and one at the west (right gate). The castle was constructed from stone blocks, each of which is  size on average. Except for its gates, the castle is mostly ruined.

The citadel was built in 1397. It was composed of an Inner Citadel made of limestone, the La Thanh Outer Wall and a 155 hectare altar. The design and decoration of architectural elements in terms of space management was meant to showcase a centralized imperial city ruled by royal power, based on Confucianism mixed with a Buddhist culture. The construction of the castle was built according to fengshui principles. The citadel was inscribed on UNESCO World Heritage Sites on June 27, 2011.

Gallery

References

External links 

 Hồ castle 

15th-century fortifications
Forts in Vietnam
Buildings and structures in Thanh Hóa province
Architecture in Vietnam
Hồ dynasty
World Heritage Sites in Vietnam
Tourist attractions in Thanh Hóa province
Citadels in Vietnam